Harry Melville "Husky" Glenn (June 9, 1890 – October 12, 1918) was a professional baseball player from 1910 to 1918.  He played a portion of the 1915 season in Major League Baseball as a catcher for the St. Louis Cardinals.  He also played eight seasons in the minor leagues including five seasons with the St. Paul Saints from 1914 to 1918.

Glenn was born in Shelburn, Indiana, in 1890.  He was drafted to serve in the military in August 1918.  He served in the U.S. Army Signal Corps where he began training as an aviation mechanic in St. Paul, Minnesota.  He developed pneumonia and died in a St. Paul Hospital in October 1918. He is buried in Highland Lawn Cemetery, Terre Haute, Indiana.

Glenn was one of eight Major League Baseball players known either to have been killed or died from illness while serving in the armed forces during World War I.  The others were Alex Burr‚ Harry Chapman, Larry Chappell‚ Eddie Grant‚ Newt Halliday, Ralph Sharman and Bun Troy.

See also
 List of baseball players who died during their careers

References

External links

1890 births
1918 deaths
Deaths from the Spanish flu pandemic in the United States
Major League Baseball catchers
St. Louis Cardinals players
Baseball players from Indiana
Vincennes Alices players
Vincennes Hoosiers players
Nashville Vols players
St. Paul Apostles players
St. Paul Saints (AA) players
United States Army personnel of World War I
American military personnel killed in World War I
United States Army Signal Corps personnel
Military personnel from Indiana